Audouinia is a genus of flowering plants belonging to the family Bruniaceae.

Its native range is South African Republic.

Species:

Audouinia capitata 
Audouinia esterhuyseniae 
Audouinia hispida 
Audouinia laevis 
Audouinia laxa

References

Bruniaceae
Asterid genera
Taxa named by Adolphe-Théodore Brongniart